The physical exploration of the Moon began when Luna 2, a space probe launched by the Soviet Union, made an impact on the surface of the Moon on September 14, 1959. Prior to that the only available means of exploration had been observation from Earth. The invention of the optical telescope brought about the first leap in the quality of lunar observations. Galileo Galilei is generally credited as the first person to use a telescope for astronomical purposes; having made his own telescope in 1609, the mountains and craters on the lunar surface were among his first observations using it.

NASA's Apollo program was the only program to successfully land humans on the Moon, which it did six times. The first landing took place in 1969, when Apollo 11 astronauts Buzz Aldrin and Neil Armstrong left scientific instruments and returned lunar samples to Earth.

The first unpiloted landing on the far side of the Moon was made by the Chinese spacecraft Chang'e 4 in early 2019, which successfully deployed the Yutu-2 lunar rover.

Before spaceflight

The ancient Greek philosopher Anaxagoras, whose non-religious view of the heavens was one cause for his imprisonment and eventual exile, reasoned that the Sun and Moon were both giant spherical rocks, and that the latter reflected the light of the former. Plutarch, in his book On the Face in the Moon's Orb, suggested that the Moon had deep recesses in which the light of the Sun did not reach and that the spots are nothing but the shadows of rivers or deep chasms. He also entertained the possibility that the Moon was inhabited. Aristarchus attempted to compute the Moon's size and distance from Earth, although his estimated distance of 20 times Earth's radius (which had been accurately determined by his contemporary Eratosthenes) proved to be about a third the actual average distance.

Chinese philosophers of the Han Dynasty believed the Moon to be energy equated to qi but recognized that the light of the Moon was a reflection of the Sun. Mathematician and astrologer Jing Fang noted the sphericity of the Moon. Shen Kuo of the Song Dynasty created an allegory equating the waxing and waning of the Moon to a round ball of reflective silver that, when doused with white powder and viewed from the side, would appear to be a crescent.

Indian astronomer Aryabhata stated in his fifth-century text Aryabhatiya that reflected sunlight is what causes the Moon to shine.

Persian astronomer Habash al-Hasib al-Marwazi conducted various observations at the Al-Shammisiyyah observatory in Baghdad between 825 and 835. In the 11th century, the Islamic physicist Alhazen investigated moonlight through a number of experiments and observations, concluding it was a combination of the moon's own light and the moon's ability to absorb and emit sunlight.

By the Middle Ages, before the invention of the telescope, an increasing number of people began to recognise the Moon as a sphere, though many believed that it was "perfectly smooth". In 1609, Galileo Galilei drew one of the first telescopic drawings of the Moon in his book  and noted that it was not smooth but had mountains and craters. Later in the 17th century, Giovanni Battista Riccioli and Francesco Maria Grimaldi drew a map of the Moon and gave many craters the names they still have today. On maps, the dark parts of the Moon's surface were called maria (singular mare) or seas, and the light parts were called terrae or continents.

Thomas Harriot, as well as Galilei, drew the first telescopic representation of the Moon and observed it for several years. His drawings, however, remained unpublished. The first map of the Moon was made by the Belgian cosmographer and astronomer Michael van Langren in 1645. Two years later a much more influential effort was published by Johannes Hevelius. In 1647, Hevelius published Selenographia, the first treatise entirely devoted to the Moon. Hevelius's nomenclature, although used in Protestant countries until the eighteenth century, was replaced by the system published in 1651 by the Jesuit astronomer Giovanni Battista Riccioli, who gave the large naked-eye spots the names of seas and the telescopic spots (now called craters) the name of philosophers and astronomers.

In 1753, the Croatian Jesuit and astronomer Roger Joseph Boscovich discovered the absence of atmosphere on the Moon. In 1824, Franz von Gruithuisen explained the formation of craters as a result of meteorite strikes.

The possibility that the Moon contains vegetation and is inhabited by selenites was seriously considered by major astronomers even into the first decades of the 19th century. In 1834–1836, Wilhelm Beer and Johann Heinrich Mädler published their four-volume  and the book  in 1837, which firmly established the conclusion that the Moon has no bodies of water nor any appreciable atmosphere.

Space Race

The Cold War-inspired "space race" and "Moon race" between the Soviet Union and the United States of America accelerated with a focus on the Moon. This included many scientifically important firsts, such as the first photographs of the then-unseen far side of the Moon in 1959 by the Soviet Union, and culminated with the landing of the first humans on the Moon in 1969, widely seen around the world as one of the pivotal events of the 20th century, and indeed of human history in general.

The first artificial object to fly by the Moon was uncrewed Soviet probe Luna 1 on January 4, 1959, and went on to be the first probe to reach a heliocentric orbit around the Sun. Few knew that Luna 1 was designed to impact the surface of the Moon.

The first probe to impact the surface of the Moon was the Soviet probe Luna 2, which made a hard landing on September 14, 1959, at 21:02:24 UTC. The far side of the Moon was first photographed on October 7, 1959, by the Soviet probe Luna 3. Though vague by today's standards, the photos showed that the far side of the Moon almost completely lacked maria.

The first American probe to fly by the Moon was Pioneer 4 on March 4, 1959, which occurred shortly after Luna 1. But it was the only success of eight American probes that first attempted to launch for the Moon.

In an effort to compete with these Soviet successes, U.S. President John F. Kennedy proposed the Moon landing in a Special Message to the Congress on Urgent National Needs:
Now it is time to take longer strides - time for a great new American enterprise - time for this nation to take a clearly leading role in space achievement, which in many ways may hold the key to our future on Earth.  ...For while we cannot guarantee that we shall one day be first, we can guarantee that any failure to make this effort will make us last.
...I believe that this nation should commit itself to achieving the goal, before this decade is out, of landing a man on the Moon and returning him safely to the Earth. No single space project in this period will be more impressive to mankind, or more important in the long-range exploration of space; and none will be so difficult or expensive to accomplish.
...let it be clear that I am asking the Congress and the country to accept a firm commitment to a new course of action—a course which will last for many years and carry very heavy costs... 

Ranger 1 launched in August 1961, just three months after President Kennedy's speech. It would be three more years and six failed Ranger missions until Ranger 7 returned close up photos of the Lunar surface before impacting it in July 1964. A number of problems with launch vehicles, ground equipment, and spacecraft electronics plagued the Ranger program and early probe missions in general. These lessons helped in Mariner 2, the only successful U.S. space probe after Kennedy's famous speech to congress and before his death in November 1963. U.S. success rates improved greatly from Ranger 7 onward.

In 1966, the USSR accomplished the first soft landings and took the first pictures from the lunar surface during the Luna 9 and Luna 13 missions.

The U.S. followed Ranger with the Surveyor program sending seven robotic spacecraft to the surface of the Moon. Five of the seven spacecraft successfully soft-landed, investigating if the regolith (dust) was shallow enough for astronauts to stand on the Moon.

On December 24, 1968, the crew of Apollo 8—Frank Borman, James Lovell and William Anders—became the first human beings to enter lunar orbit and see the far side of the Moon in person. Humans first landed on the Moon on July 20, 1969. The first human to walk on the lunar surface was Neil Armstrong, commander of the U.S. mission Apollo 11.

The first robot lunar rover to land on the Moon was the Soviet vessel Lunokhod 1 on November 17, 1970, as part of the Lunokhod programme. To date, the last human to stand on the Moon was Eugene Cernan, who as part of the Apollo 17 mission, walked on the Moon in December 1972.

Moon rock samples were brought back to Earth by three Luna missions (Luna 16, 20, and 24) and the Apollo missions 11 through 17 (except Apollo 13, which aborted its planned lunar landing). Luna 24 in 1976 was the last Lunar mission by either the Soviet Union or the U.S. until Clementine in 1994. Focus shifted to probes to other planets, space stations, and the Shuttle program.

Before the Moon race, the U.S. had pre-projects for scientific and military moonbases: the Lunex Project and Project Horizon. Besides crewed landings, the abandoned Soviet crewed lunar programs included the building of a multipurpose moonbase "Zvezda", the first detailed project, complete with developed mockups of expedition vehicles and surface modules.

After 1990

In 1990, Japan visited the Moon with the Hiten spacecraft, becoming the third country to place an object in orbit around the Moon. The spacecraft released the Hagoromo probe into lunar orbit, but the transmitter failed, thereby preventing further scientific use of the spacecraft. In September 2007, Japan launched the SELENE spacecraft, with the objectives "to obtain scientific data of the lunar origin and evolution and to develop the technology for the future lunar exploration", according to the JAXA official website.

The European Space Agency launched a small, low-cost lunar orbital probe called SMART 1 on September 27, 2003. SMART 1's primary goal was to take three-dimensional X-ray and infrared imagery of the lunar surface. SMART 1 entered lunar orbit on November 15, 2004, and continued to make observations until September 3, 2006, when it was intentionally crashed into the lunar surface in order to study the impact plume.

Planned commercial missions 
In 2007, the X Prize Foundation together with Google launched the Google Lunar X Prize to encourage commercial endeavors to the Moon. A prize of $20 million was to be awarded to the first private venture to get to the Moon with a robotic lander by the end of March 2018, with additional prizes worth $10 million for further milestones. As of August 2016, 16 teams were reportedly participating in the competition. In January 2018 the foundation announced that the prize would go unclaimed as none of the finalist teams would be able to make a launch attempt by the deadline.

In August 2016, the US government granted permission to US-based start-up Moon Express to land on the Moon. This marked the first time that a private enterprise was given the right to do so. The decision is regarded as a precedent helping to define regulatory standards for deep-space commercial activity in the future. Previously, private companies were restricted to operating on or around Earth.

On 29 November 2018, NASA announced that nine commercial companies would compete to win a contract to send small payloads to the Moon in what is known as Commercial Lunar Payload Services. According to NASA administrator Jim Bridenstine, "We are building a domestic American capability to get back and forth to the surface of the moon.".

China has begun the Chinese Lunar Exploration Program for exploring the Moon and is investigating the prospect of lunar mining, specifically looking for the isotope helium-3 for use as an energy source on Earth. China launched the Chang'e 1 robotic lunar orbiter on October 24, 2007. Originally planned for a one-year mission, the Chang'e 1 mission was very successful and ended up being extended for another four months. On March 1, 2009, Chang'e 1 was intentionally impacted on the lunar surface completing the 16-month mission. On October 1, 2010, China launched the Chang'e 2 lunar orbiter. China landed the rover Chang'e 3 on the Moon on December 14, 2013, became the third country to have done so. Chang'e 3 is the first spacecraft to soft-land on lunar surface since Luna 24 in 1976.  Since the Chang'e 3 mission was a success, the backup lander Chang'e 4 was re-purposed for the new mission goals. China launched on 7 December 2018 the Chang'e 4 mission to the lunar farside. On January 3, 2019, Chang'e 4 landed on the far side of the Moon. Chang'e 4 deployed the Yutu-2 moon rover, which subsequently became the current record distance-holder for lunar surface travel. Among other discoveries, Yutu-2 found that the dust at some locations of the far side of the Moon is up to 12 meters deep.

India's national space agency, Indian Space Research Organisation (ISRO), launched Chandrayaan-1, an uncrewed lunar orbiter, on October 22, 2008. The lunar probe was originally intended to orbit the Moon for two years, with scientific objectives to prepare a three-dimensional atlas of the near and far side of the Moon and to conduct a chemical and mineralogical mapping of the lunar surface. The orbiter released the Moon Impact Probe which impacted the Moon at 15:04 GMT on November 14, 2008, making India the fourth country to reach the lunar surface. Among Chandrayaan's many achievements was the discovery of the widespread presence of water molecules in the lunar soil. This mission was followed up by Chandrayaan-2, which launched on July 22, 2019, and entered lunar orbit on August 20, 2019. Chandrayaan-2 also carried India's first lander and rover, but these crash-landed.

The Ballistic Missile Defense Organization and NASA launched the Clementine mission in 1994, and Lunar Prospector in 1998. NASA launched the Lunar Reconnaissance Orbiter, on June 18, 2009, which has collected imagery of the Moon's surface. It also carried the Lunar Crater Observation and Sensing Satellite (LCROSS), which investigated the possible existence of water in Cabeus crater. GRAIL is another mission, launched in 2011.

The first commercial mission to the Moon was accomplished by the Manfred Memorial Moon Mission (4M), led by LuxSpace, an affiliate of German OHB AG. The mission was launched on 23 October 2014 with the Chinese Chang'e 5-T1 test spacecraft, attached to the upper stage of a Long March 3C/G2 rocket. The 4M spacecraft made a Moon flyby on a night of October 28, 2014, after which it entered elliptical Earth orbit, exceeding its designed lifetime by four times.

The Beresheet lander operated by Israel Aerospace Industries and SpaceIL impacted the Moon on April 11, 2019, after a failed landing attempt.

China planned to conduct a sample return mission with its Chang'e 5 spacecraft in 2017, but that mission was postponed due to the failure of the Long March 5 launch vehicle. However, after a successful return of flight by the Long March 5 rocket in late December 2019, China targeted its Chang'e 5 sample return mission for late 2020. China completed this mission on December 16, 2020, with the return of approximately 2 kilograms of lunar sample.

Plans

Following the abandoned US Constellation program, plans for crewed flights followed by moonbases were declared by Russia, ESA, China, Japan and India. All of them intend to continue the exploration of Moon with more uncrewed spacecraft.

India is planning to launch the Chandrayaan-3 lander mission in 2023, and it is studying a potential collaboration with Japan to launch the Lunar Polar Exploration Mission in 2024.

Russia also announced plans to resume its previously frozen project Luna-Glob, an uncrewed lander and orbiter, which was slated to launch in 2021 but did not manifest. In 2015, Roscosmos stated that Russia plans to place an astronaut on the Moon by 2030, leaving Mars to NASA. The purpose is to work jointly with NASA and avoid a space race. A Russian Lunar Orbital Station has been proposed to orbit around the Moon after 2030.

In 2018, NASA released plans to return to the Moon with commercial and international partners as part of an overall agency Exploration Campaign in support of Space Policy Directive 1, giving rise to the Artemis program and the Commercial Lunar Payload Services (CLPS). NASA plans to start with robotic missions on the lunar surface, as well as the crewed Lunar Gateway. As of 2019, NASA is issuing contracts to develop new small lunar payload delivery services, develop lunar landers, and conduct more research on the Moon's surface ahead of a human return. Artemis program involves several flights of the Orion spacecraft and lunar landings from 2022 to 2028.

On November 3, 2021, NASA announced it had picked a landing site in the lunar south polar region near the crater Shackleton for an uncrewed spacecraft that included NASA's Polar Resources Ice-Mining Experiment-1. The precise location was termed the Shackleton Connecting Ridge, which features the advantage of near-continuous solar exposure and line-of-sight with Earth for communication.

ESA's Moonlight initiative aims to create a small network of communication and navigation satellites orbiting the Moon to support the Artemis landings. These would enable communication with Earth even when out of direct line-of-sight. They would also provide navigation signals similar to the Global Positioning System on Earth, requiring precision timekeeping. Moonlight planners have proposed creating a new time zone for the Moon for this purpose. Due to the lower gravity and relative motion, time passes more quickly on the Moon, making every 24-hour period elapse 56 microseconds early when measured from Earth.

See also 

Artemis program
Colonization of the Moon
Tourism on the Moon
Lunar outpost (NASA)
International Lunar Exploration Working Group
List of artificial objects on the Moon
List of Apollo astronauts
List of lunar probes
Lunar resources
Moon landing
Timeline of Solar System exploration
Yutu-2

References

External links

An interactive web documentary about the Moon – ESA
Lunar mission timeline – NASA

 
Exploration of Moon
Spaceflight
Moon